The Diamond Tree is a giant karri tree located 10 km south of Manjimup, Western Australia on the South Western Highway.

A wooden viewing platform built in 1939 is located 49 metres up, and was the oldest wooden platform fire look-out in use until its closure in 2019.

The Diamond Tree was one of three lookout trees in the Southern Forests and was used as a fire lookout every summer from 1941 to 1973.  The tower was used by DEC (Department of Environment & Conservation) to support aerial surveillance from time to time.

Diamond Tree was permanently closed to climbing in 2019 after expert assessments found rot in the base of the tree and recommended all climbing should cease.

See also
List of individual trees
Dave Evans Bicentennial Tree
Gloucester Tree
List of named Eucalyptus trees

References

External links
 Parks and Wildlife Service WA
 Diamond Tree Lookout
 Diamond Tree article - Department of Environment and Conservation

Individual eucalypts
Individual trees in Western Australia
Forests of Western Australia